Tyler Lawrence France (born July 13, 1994) is an American professional baseball first baseman for the Seattle Mariners of Major League Baseball (MLB). He previously played for the San Diego Padres.

Amateur career
France attended South Hills High School in West Covina, California. After high school, he played college baseball from 2013-2015 at San Diego State University. In 2013, he played summer college baseball with the Bethesda Big Train, for whom he was the team's Outstanding Hitter.   In 2015, his junior season, he hit .336 with four home runs and 49 RBIs in 64 games, and finished his career at San Diego State with a .337/.428/.470 line across three seasons. He was drafted 1017th overall, in the 34th round of the 2015 MLB draft by the San Diego Padres, and signed with them for a $100,000 signing bonus.

Professional career

San Diego Padres
France made his professional debut in 2015 with the Class A Short Season Tri-City Dust Devils, hitting .294/.425/.391/.816 with 1 home run and 36 RBI. He split the 2016 season between the Class A Fort Wayne TinCaps and the Class A-Advanced Lake Elsinore Storm, hitting .271/.387/.420/.807 with 14 home runs and 73 RBI. He split his 2017 season between Lake Elsinore and the Double-A San Antonio Missions, hitting .278/.353/.373/.726 with 5 home runs and 58 RBI. He split the 2018 season between San Antonio and the Triple-A El Paso Chihuahuas, hitting .267/.355/.464/.819 with 22 home runs and 96 RBI.

The Padres added him to their 40-man roster after the 2018 season. France opened the 2019 season back with El Paso. On April 24, he was called up to the major league roster for the first time. He made his debut on April 26; he hit a pinch hit single in his first at bat.

France was called up again to the Padres big league club on August 16, 2019.  At that time he was batting .399 with their minor league affiliate El Paso Chihuahuas.  Although he had wanted to end his AAA season batting .400 he remained with the big league club for the duration of 2019 and ended .001 point shy of the elusive .400 mark.

France made the Opening Day roster to the start the 2020 season for the Padres for the first time. He was the starting designated hitter on Opening Day, which had been added to the National League for the 2020 season due to the new COVID-19 rules. He had 1 hit in 4 at-bats in the Padres' 7-2 victory over the Arizona Diamondbacks. On August 13, 2020, France was optioned to the Padres alternative roster to make room for shortstop Jorge Mateo.

Seattle Mariners
On August 30, 2020, the Padres traded France, Taylor Trammell, Andrés Muñoz, and Luis Torrens to the Seattle Mariners for Austin Nola, Dan Altavilla, and Austin Adams. In 23 games for Seattle, France hit .302 with 2 home runs and 13 RBI.

In 2021, France slashed .291/.368/.445 with 18 home runs, 73 RBIs, and 85 runs scored in 152 games. He tied for the major league lead in hit by pitch, with 27.

On April 23, 2022, France recorded his first career five-hit game, going 5-for-6 with a home run in a game versus the Kansas City Royals.
On April 25, France and Miguel Cabrera were awarded American League co-player of the week. France was named to the 2022 MLB All-Star Game as an injury replacement for Mike Trout.

On January 13, 2023, France agreed to a one-year, $4.1 million contract with the Mariners, avoiding salary arbitration.

Personal life
France and his wife, Maggie, married in January 2022.

References

External links

Living people
1994 births
Sportspeople from Downey, California
Baseball players from California
Major League Baseball first basemen
Major League Baseball third basemen
San Diego Padres players
Seattle Mariners players
American League All-Stars
San Diego State Aztecs baseball players
Tri-City Dust Devils players
Fort Wayne TinCaps players
Lake Elsinore Storm players
San Antonio Missions players
El Paso Chihuahuas players